The Office of Electricity (OE) is a program office within the United States Department of Energy. The mission of OE is "to lead national efforts to modernize the electric grid; enhance security and reliability of the energy infrastructure; and facilitate recovery from disruptions to energy supply." It does this through the development and implementation of national policy pertaining to electric grid reliability, and through the management of research, development, and demonstration activities for "next generation" electric grid infrastructure technologies.

Responsibilities
The Office is responsible for leading efforts to modernize the electric grid. This is done through the development and implementation of national policy pertaining to electric grid reliability, and through the management of research, development, and demonstration activities for "next generation" electric grid infrastructure technologies. The Office is responsible of for the analysis of electricity congestion, the designation of draft National Interest Electric Transmission Corridors, the coordination of energy corridors across federal lands, and workforce issues related to the electricity utility industry. The Office of Electricity also works with the Department of Homeland Security and other agencies to enhance the security of the nation's critical energy infrastructure.

The Office of Electricity works with the United States Department of Homeland Security and other agencies to enhance the security of the nation's critical energy infrastructure.

Organization

The Office is under the general supervision of the Under Secretary of Energy for Science and Innovation. The Office is administered by the Assistant Secretary for Electricity (ASE), who is appointed by the President of the United States. 
The Assistant Secretary for Electricity Delivery and Energy Reliability is appointed by the President with the advice and consent of the Senate. The Assistant Secretary is paid at level IV of the Executive Schedule. The Assistant Secretary is assisted in running the Office by Deputy Assistant Secretaries, who can be career employees or political appointees. Each of the Deputy Assistant Secretaries oversee a different branch of the Office's work.

Effective October 21, 2022, the Office of Electricity has the following reporting relationships:

Assistant Secretary
Chief of Staff
Chief Operating Officer, Corporate Business Operations
Director, Budget
Director, Communications
Director, Procurement, Strategic Planning and Operations
Director, Workforce Development
Principal Deputy Assistant Secretary
Deputy Assistant Secretary for Grid Systems and Components
Director, Grid Systems
Director, Grid Components
Director, Applied Grid Transformation
Deputy Assistant Secretary for Grid Controls and Communications
Director, Grid Monitoring
Director, Grid Controls
Director, Grid Cybersecurity and Communications
Deputy Assistant Secretary for Energy Storage
Director, Storage Analysis
Director, Storage Validation
Director, Storage Materials and Systems

References

Sources

External links
 

United States Department of Energy agencies
Renewable energy organizations based in the United States